Stephen McNally (born 15 March 1984) is a Scottish footballer currently without a club.

References

External links
 (misspelt)

Living people
1984 births
Scottish footballers
Association football defenders
Scottish Premier League players
Scottish Football League players
Dundee F.C. players
Peterhead F.C. players
Forfar Athletic F.C. players
Montrose F.C. players
Footballers from Dundee